The Guvernanta Sonorilo Esperanto (GSE) is the Esperanto club at Norfolk Academy. Guvernanta Sonorilo Esperanto means Tutoring Bell Esperanto, and is held at the school's time set aside for tutoring by teachers, club meetings, or schoolwork.

Goals
The GSE hopes to positively affect the Esperanto community, and hopes to increase awareness of Esperanto in the Norfolk Academy Community.

Esperanto organizations